Sciodrepoides is a genus of small carrion beetles in the family Leiodidae. There are about five described species in Sciodrepoides.

Species
These five species belong to the genus Sciodrepoides:
 Sciodrepoides alpestris Jeannel, 1934 g
 Sciodrepoides fumatus (Spence, 1815) g
 Sciodrepoides latinotum Peck and Cook, 2002 i g
 Sciodrepoides terminans (LeConte, 1850) i g b
 Sciodrepoides watsoni (Spence, 1815) i g b
Data sources: i = ITIS, c = Catalogue of Life, g = GBIF, b = Bugguide.net

References

Further reading

 
 
 
 
 
 

 
Leiodidae
Staphyliniformia genera